The San Francisco Bay Area is currently defined by Nielsen Media Research as the sixth-largest television market in the United States, with all of the major U.S. television networks having affiliates serving the region. All but two of the major U.S. television networks are directly owned by the networks; the two exceptions are MyNetworkTV affiliate KRON-TV, which is owned by Nexstar Media Group and The CW affiliate KBCW, which is owned by CBS News and Stations in a duopoly with KPIX-TV.

Television stations that primarily serve the San Francisco Bay Area include:
1 KAXT-CD Santa Clara (Decades)* (transmit channel 22)
2 KTVU Oakland (Fox)* (transmit channel 26)
4 KRON-TV San Francisco (MyNetworkTV) (transmit channel 7)
5 KPIX-TV San Francisco (CBS)* (transmit channel 29)
6 KBKF-LD San Jose (Air1) (transmit channel 6)
7 KGO-TV San Francisco (ABC)* (transmit channel 12)
8 KQSL Cloverdale (TLN West) (transmit channel 8)
9 KQED San Francisco (PBS) (transmit channel 30)
11 KNTV San Jose (NBC)* (transmit channel 13)
14 KDTV-DT San Francisco (Univision)* (transmit channel 20)
16 KSCZ-LD San Jose (Hải Lê/Vietnamese) (transmit channel 23) 
18 KQRM-LD San Francisco (Crossings TV) 
20 KOFY-TV San Francisco (Grit) (transmit channel 21)
22 KRCB Cotati (PBS) (transmit channel 5)
26 KTSF San Francisco (Ethnic independent) (transmit channel 20)
28 KCNZ-CD San Francisco (LATV) (transmit channel 21)
32 KMTP-TV San Francisco (Non-commercial independent) (transmit channel 21)
36 KICU-TV San Jose (Independent) (transmit channel 36)
38 KCNS San Francisco (ShopHQ) (transmit channel 32)
42 KTNC-TV Concord (TCT)* (transmit channel 32)
44 KBCW San Francisco (The CW) (transmit channel 28)
48 KSTS San Jose (Telemundo)* (transmit channel 19)
50 KEMO-TV Fremont (Estrella TV) (transmit channel 32)
54 KQEH San Jose (PBS) (transmit channel 30)
60 KPJK San Mateo (Non-commercial independent) (transmit channel 27)
65 KKPX-TV San Jose (Ion Television)* (transmit channel 33)
66 KFSF-DT Vallejo (UniMás)*
68 KTLN-TV Palo Alto (Heroes & Icons)* (transmit channel 22)
Asterisk (*) indicates channel is a network owned-and-operated station.

Defunct stations 

 42 KCFT-TV/Concord (1966)
 27 KEXT-CD/San Jose (1994–2017)
 32 KSAN-TV–KNEW-TV–KQEC/San Francisco (1954–1972, 1977–1979, 1980–1988)
 38 KUDO–KVOF-TV/San Francisco (1968–1985)

See also 
CBS News Bay Area
Comcast Hometown Network
NBC Sports Bay Area
NBC Sports California

References 

 
Television
San Francisco Bay Area